Schiaparelli is a surname. Notable people with the surname include:

Elsa Schiaparelli (1890–1973), Italian-born French fashion designer
Ernesto Schiaparelli (1856–1928), Italian Egyptologist
Giovanni Schiaparelli (1835–1910), Italian astronomer who made the observations that produced the false idea of "canals" on the surface of Mars

See also 

 Schiaparelli (disambiguation)
 Schiapparelli

Italian-language surnames